Carleton Monroe Winslow (December 27, 1876 – 1946), also known as Carleton Winslow Sr., was an American architect, and key proponent of Spanish Colonial Revival architecture in Southern California in the early 20th century.

Biography
Winslow was born December 27, 1876, in Damariscotta, Maine, studied at the Art Institute of Chicago and at the École des Beaux-Arts, and joined the office of Bertram Goodhue in time for the planning of the 1915 San Diego Panama–California Exposition.  Winslow is the one credited for choosing the Spanish Colonial style for that project, a choice with a  vernacular regional precedent.

He moved to Southern California in 1917, where he completed the Los Angeles Public Library after Goodhue's death in 1924 and also pursued his own commissions, including a number of Episcopal churches.  With Clarence Stein, he wrote The architecture and the gardens of the San Diego Exposition.  

His son, Carleton Winslow, Jr. (1919 – 1983), was also an architect, specializing in churches in Southern California, as well as an architectural history professor and author.

Work
 St. James Episcopal Church, South Pasadena, as associate of Cram, Goodhue & Ferguson, 1907
 All Saints' Episcopal Church, San Diego, 1913, with William S. Hebbard
 Official seal of the city of San Diego, 1914
 multiple buildings at the Panama–California Exposition, 1915, in collaboration with Bertram Goodhue; solely credited for certain structures including the Botanical Building
 multiple buildings at the Bishop's School (1916 Bishops Chapel, 1930 Bishops Chapel Tower, 1930 second story and dome of Bentham Hall, 1934 Wheeler Bailey Library), some with architectural sculpture, La Jolla, California
 Casa Dorinda, private mansion for Henry W.H. Bliss and wife Anna Dorinda Blaksley, Montecito, California, 1916
 Santa Barbara Museum of Natural History, Santa Barbara, California, 1916, with Floyd E. Brewster
 studio for painter Adolfo Müller-Ury, 3400 Monterey Road, San Marino, California, 1923 (finished late 1924)
 Los Angeles Public Library, completing the project after Bertram Goodhue's death in 1924
 Santa Barbara Public Library, 1924
 Carthay Circle Theatre, with Dwight Gibbs, Mid-Wilshire district of Los Angeles, 1926 (razed)
 First Baptist Church, Pasadena, with Frederick Kennedy, 1926 
 Bel-Air Country Club, Bel Air, Los Angeles, California, 1926
 design of 18 stained glass windows for the passenger liner City of Honolulu, 1927
 Ojai Library, part of the Ventura County Library System, Ojai, California, 1928
 St. Mary of the Angels Church, Hollywood, 1930
 St. Paul's Episcopal Church, 260 East Alvarado, Pomona, California, 1931
 St. Mark's Episcopal Church, Glendale, California, Winslow's last design and completed by Louis A. Thomas, 1948

References
 Andree, Herb, and Noel Young. Santa Barbara Architecture: from Spanish Colonial to Modern. Second edition. With photographs by Wayne McCall and an introduction by David Gebhard. Santa Barbara: Capra Press, 1980.

Notes

External links
Pacific Coast Architecture Database (PCAD): Carleton Winslow — biography and list of works.

Architects from Los Angeles
School of the Art Institute of Chicago alumni
American alumni of the École des Beaux-Arts
Architects from Maine
1876 births
1946 deaths
People from Damariscotta, Maine
Balboa Park (San Diego)
Spanish Colonial Revival architects